In 2009–10, FC Barcelona started the new season with the prospect of winning six major competitions in the 2008–2009 season. They contested for the Supercopa de España, UEFA Super Cup, FIFA Club World Cup, Copa del Rey, La Liga, and the UEFA Champions League. During the summer transfer window, the club swapped their top league goal scorer during the treble season, Samuel Eto'o to Italy's Inter Milan in exchange for Zlatan Ibrahimović, along with €48 million, bringing the total to €69 million.
On 16 May, Barcelona claimed its 20th league title with a then-record 99 points via a 4–0 victory over relegated side Valladolid to finish their 2009–10 season with four titles. This Barca team is regarded as one of the Greatest and successful team in the history of Sports.

Overview
Over the summer of 2009, along with Ibrahimović, Barcelona reinforced their squad with the signings of Inter Milan defender Maxwell, Brazilian club Palmeiras forward Keirrison (sent on loan with Portuguese club Benfica, then loaned out during the winter transfer window to Italian side Fiorentina), and Ukrainian team Shakhtar Donetsk defender Dmytro Chyhrynskyi. Continuing its tradition of using canteranos on the first team, Barcelona manager Pep Guardiola also promoted four players from the youth reserves, Jonathan dos Santos, Jeffrén, Andreu Fontàs and Marc Muniesa. Barcelona player Henrique, previously on loan with Bayer Leverkusen, briefly rejoined the squad for the pre-season but was again loaned out, this time to [Racing de Santander].

Off the field events
On 23 September, it was discovered by Catalan newspaper El Periódico of an investigation into the daily lives of four possible candidates for the Barcelona presidential election in 2010. The investigation was authorized by FC Barcelona director general, Joan Oliver, who hired investigating company Metodo 3 to gather daily information on vice president of institution and assets administration Joan Franquesa, vice president for marketing and media Jaume Ferrer, vice president for finance and treasurer Joan Boix, and vice president for sport Rafael Yuste between late March and early April 2009. Oliver stated in a press conference the next day at the Camp Nou that "Barça did no spying but were just protecting the entity of the club".

President Joan Laporta stated that "this happened five months ago. Certain events happened and when I found out about them, the corresponding explanations were given. These explanations were understood and accepted since no law was broken." He added that "it was understood that the reports that were asked for were within the limits of legality and were to protect the affected parties and the club. Therefore, the page was turned and the case was closed." Laporta also said that "we are better than we have ever been in our entire history in our methods of operation, and now, because they want to destabilise us, people drag up issues like these. We will continue the same way, because everyone does it as well. We are used to living under pressure and people trying to destabilise us… Barça is united and united we are unbeatable."

Barcelona manager Pep Guardiola stated that "he has shielded the squad from the scandal of the investigation" and that "the subject has not been spoken of in the locker room and even the captains have not mentioned it, there's total concentration."

On 11 November, vice-president Joan Franquesa handed in his resignation for "personal reasons". Continuing the turmoil in the Barcelona Board-Room. President Joan Laporta took action by restructuring the board of directors and making Albert Perrín, the new vice-president. Laporta stated "He was making changes for these individuals to get to know the best club better."

Ballon d'Or & FIFA World Player of the Year
On 1 December, France Football magazine announced Lionel Messi was the winner of the 2009 Ballon d'Or, thus making him the ninth player while playing at Barcelona and the first Argentine and canterano from La Masia to win the coveted footballer prize. Messi dedicated his triumph at the Ciutat Esportiva Joan Gamper to "my family, who have always been by my side and my teammates at Barça who've done everything to ensure I could win the award". He also addressed his teammates Xavi and Andrés Iniesta, who finished third and fourth respectively: "They've given everything for Barça and they deserve their recognition. If I'd had a vote I would have voted for any of the Barça players."

On 21 December, Messi was named 2009 FIFA World Player of the Year at the Kongresshaus Zürich in Zürich. Messi claimed the prize by a record vote with a considerable wide margin, receiving 1,073 votes to Real Madrid forward Cristiano Ronaldo's 352 votes, who finished second after winning the year before. Teammates Xavi and Iniesta finished in third and fifth respectively, closing out 2009 as one of the most memorable years in Barcelona history.

On 16 January, Messi became the youngest player to score 100 official goals for the Catalan club. He achieved the feat by scoring a brace in a league match vs Sevilla at the Camp Nou. He stated, "It was a relief to get the goal" and "the truth is that with all the big things that have happened to me, well I’m not giving them too much importance. I just try and live quietly and normally and keep my eye on achieving more."

On 16 May, Messi completed the 2009–10 as the Pichichi Throphy and the European Golden Shoe winner with 34 league goals. Víctor Valdés won the Zamora Trophy for the best La Liga goalkeeper of the season.

IFFHS Awards
On 13 January, the International Federation of Football History & Statistic named Xavi the 2009 World's Best Playmaker and both teammates Lionel Messi and Andrés Iniesta received second and fourth place respectively. Lastly, manager Pep Guardiola was named 2009 World Club Coach.

FIFA Club World Cup & season friendly
On 6 November, director general Joan Oliver confirmed that Barcelona would play a friendly in Kuwait on 21 December against Kuwaiti club Kazma Sporting Club at Al-Sadaqua Walsalam Stadium. It took place after the FIFA Club World Cup which was being hosted in the same region by the United Arab Emirates. The match finished 1–1 with both goals coming in the last 10 minutes of the match in front of a sold-out crowd that gathered 45 minutes ahead of the kick-off time. Barcelona received €1.7 million to participate in the match.

On 16 December, Pedro became the first player in history to score in six different club competitions during a single season. He scored in La Liga, Copa del Rey, UEFA Champions League, UEFA Super Cup, Supercopa de España and the FIFA Club World Cup.

On 19 December, Barcelona was crowned FIFA Club World Cup champion with a 1–2 win over Argentine club Estudiantes in the final, making it the sixth title they've won in 2009 and the first club to accomplish that feat within one calendar year known as The Sextuple.

Squad

Total squad cost: €200 million

From youth system

Players in / out

In 

Total spending:  €85.5 million + Samuel Eto'o

Out 

Total income:   €2 million.

Expenditure:   €83.5 million + Eto'o.

Player statistics

Squad stats

Disciplinary records

Club

Coaching staff

Pre-season

Competitions

Overall
As in nine out of the last ten seasons, Barcelona is going to be present in all major competitions: La Liga, the UEFA Champions League and the Copa del Rey. The previous season's treble success means that Barcelona will also contest the FIFA Club World Cup, the UEFA Super Cup and the Supercopa de España. The side will also be present in the Copa Catalunya.

Supercopa de España

UEFA Super Cup

FIFA Club World Cup

La Liga

League table

Results summary

Results by round

Matches

Copa del Rey

Round of 32

Round of 16

UEFA Champions League

Group stage

Knockout phase

Round of 16

Quarter-finals

Semi-finals

Friendly

References

External links 
 

Spanish football clubs 2009–10 season
2009-10
2009-10
2009-10
2009–10 in Catalan football